The list of ship launches in 1707 includes a chronological list of some ships launched in 1707.


References

1707
Ship launches